Mian Qaleh-ye Talani (also Romanized as Mīān Qal‘eh-ye Tālānī; also known as Mīyānqaleh) is a village in Howmeh-ye Shomali Rural District, in the Central District of Eslamabad-e Gharb County, Kermanshah Province, Iran. At the 2006 census, its population was 88, in 24 families.

References 

Populated places in Eslamabad-e Gharb County